The Labour Leader is a 1917 British silent drama film directed by Thomas Bentley and starring Fred Groves, Fay Compton and Owen Nares. The film was based on an original screenplay by Kenelm Foss.

Plot summary
After his friend impregnates a laundress, a socialist marries her while navigating his own rise to become a Labour Party Member of Parliament.

Cast
 Fred Groves as John Webster
 Fay Compton as Diana Hazlitt
 Owen Nares as Gilbert Hazlitt
Christine Silver as Nell Slade
 Lauri de Frece as Bert Slade
 Frederick Volpe as Sir George Hazlitt

References

Bibliography
 Low, Rachael. History of the British Film, 1914-1918. Routledge, 2005.

External links

1917 films
1917 drama films
1910s political drama films
1910s English-language films
Films directed by Thomas Bentley
British silent feature films
British political drama films
Films about the labor movement
History of the Labour Party (UK)
British black-and-white films
1910s British films
Silent drama films